The Lady in the Car (German: Die Dame im Auto) is a 1919 German silent crime film directed by Adolf Gärtner. It was one of a series of films featuring Rolf Loer as Phantomas.

Cast
In alphabetical order
 Rolf Loer as Phantomas
 Ernst Pittschau as Jens Lofthus - bankier
 Emil Rameau as Hansen - makler
 Preben J. Rist as Unbekannter
 Lya Sellin as Dame im Auto
 Elsa Wagner as Schwester

References

Bibliography
 Hans-Michael Bock and Tim Bergfelder. The Concise Cinegraph: An Encyclopedia of German Cinema. Berghahn Books.

External links

1919 films
Films of the Weimar Republic
Films directed by Adolf Gärtner
German silent feature films
Fantômas films
German black-and-white films
German crime films
1919 crime films
1910s German films